Oyuklu can refer to:

 Oyuklu, Çüngüş
 Oyuklu, Midyat